HDR10 Media Profile, more commonly known as HDR10, is an open high-dynamic-range video (HDR) standard announced on 27 August 2015 by the Consumer Technology Association. It is the most widespread of the HDR formats. 

HDR10 is not backward compatible with SDR. It includes HDR static metadata but not dynamic metadata. It doesn't offer the ability to optimize content to the consumer display's capabilities in a way based on the content creator's intent.

PQ10 refers to an HDR format that is same as HDR10 without any metadata.

Technical details 
HDR10 is defined as:

 EOTF: SMPTE ST 2084 (PQ)
 Bit depth: 10 bit
 Color primaries: ITU-R BT.2020 (identical to BT.2100 primaries)
 Static metadata: SMPTE ST 2086 (mastering display color volume), MaxFALL (maximum frame-average light level), and MaxCLL (maximum content light level)
 Color sub-sampling: 4:2:0 (for compressed video sources)

PQ10 refers to an HDR format that uses PQ, 10-bit and Rec. 2100 color primaries without having any metadata.

HDR10 is technically limited to a maximum of 10,000 nits peak brightness, however common HDR10 contents are mastered with peak brightness from 1,000 to 4,000 nits.

HDR10 is not backwards compatible with SDR displays.

On HDR10 displays that have lower color volume than the HDR10 content (for example lower peak brightness capability), the HDR10 metadata gives information to help adjust the content. However, the metadata is static (remain the same for the entire video) and does not tell how the content should be adjusted. Thus, the decision is up to the display and the creative intents might not be preserved.

Competing formats to HDR10 are Dolby Vision and HDR10+ (which do provide dynamic metadata, allowing to preserve the creative intents on each display and on a scene by scene or frame by frame basis), and also HLG (which provides some degree of backward compatibility with SDR).

Adoption 

HDR10 is supported by a wide variety of companies, which include monitor and TV manufacturers such as Dell, LG,  Samsung, Sharp, VU, Sony, and Vizio, as well as Sony Interactive Entertainment, Microsoft and Apple which support HDR10 on their PlayStation 4, Xbox One video game console and Apple TV platforms, respectively.

Hardware 

 TV
 Audio-video interfaces
 Smartphones displays
 Smartphones camera
 Digital camera
 Mobile SoC
Game consoles

Contents 

 Ultra HD Blu-ray
 Streaming services

Software 

 Media player
 Color grading

See also 

 High-dynamic-range television

References 

Standards
High dynamic range